The Marlboro Asian Badminton Championships 1987  took place in the month of December in Semarang, Indonesia. Only men's team competition were conducted. At the end of day, China won the championships beating Indonesia in the final while South Korea won the bronze medal playoff defeating Malaysian team.

Medalists

Semifinals

China V/s South Korea

Malaysia V/s Indonesia 

Razif Sidek suffered a stomach injury in third match.

Bronze medal tie 
Malaysia V/s South Korea

Final 
China V/s Indonesia

References 

Badminton Asia Championships
Asian Badminton Championships
1987 Badminton Asia Championships
Badminton Asia Championships
Badminton Asia Championships